Nebraska Highway 70 is a highway in central Nebraska.  Its western terminus is at an intersection with Nebraska Highway 2 and Nebraska Highway 92 east of Broken Bow.  Its eastern terminus is at Nebraska Highway 14 in Elgin.

Route description
Nebraska Highway 70 begins at an intersection with NE 2 and NE 92 just east of Broken Bow. It heads in an eastward direction into farmland from here, where it intersects with US 183 north of Westerville. It runs concurrently with US 183 for about a mile before splitting off to the east again, passing through Westerville. The highway runs to the east and northeast, passing through Arcadia. East of Arcadia, it meets NE 58 and heads northward, passing by NE 22 as well. In Ord, it intersects NE 11 and runs concurrently to the east with it for just about a mile. NE 70 exits Ord and heads in a northeasterly direction, where it will meet with NE 91 west of Ericson. NE 70 and NE 91 run concurrently through Ericson before meeting with US 281 to the east. Further east, the highway enters Elgin where it terminates at an intersection with NE 14.

Major intersections

References

External links

The Nebraska Highways Page: Highways 61 to 100

070
Transportation in Custer County, Nebraska
Transportation in Valley County, Nebraska
Transportation in Garfield County, Nebraska
Transportation in Wheeler County, Nebraska
Transportation in Antelope County, Nebraska